Erik "Totte" Åkerlund (6 March 1915 – 16 March 2009) was a Swedish curler.

He was also a curling activist, in the years 1953-1970 he sat on the board of the Swedish Federation of Curling, additionally he served as treasurer (1954-1956), vice president (1963-1966) and from 1970 to 1972 president.

In 1966 he was inducted into the Swedish Curling Hall of Fame.

Totte was also active in the squash environment. Initially, a playing field was organized in his house (Villa Åkerlund, now the seat of the US embassy). In 1946 he was one of the founders of Stockholms Squashklubb, the first Swedish club. He took part in international matches, among others with England and Denmark and also won the unofficial national championship of Group B in 1943. He also practiced golf until late old age.

Teams

Personal life
Totte grew up in family of curlers: his father Erik was a four-time Swedish men's curling champion in 1920–1930s, and his brother (Totte's uncle) Rune was also a curler and 1932 Swedish men's curling champion.

References

External links
 

1915 births
2009 deaths
Swedish male curlers
Swedish curling champions